Oniel David Fisher (born 22 November 1991) is a Jamaican professional footballer who plays as a right-back and midfielder for the Jamaica national team.

Club career

Youth, college and amateur
Fisher spent his youth career with St. George's SC in Jamaica before moving to the U.S. to play college soccer at Tyler Junior College. In his two seasons with the Apaches, he made a total of 20 appearances and tallied six goals and three assists.

In 2013, Fisher transferred to the University of New Mexico, making him Lobo Soccer's first-ever Jamaican student-athlete.  In his two seasons with the Lobos, he made a total of 29 appearances and tallied four goals and three assists and helped lead them to the College Cup semifinals in 2013.

Fisher also played in the Premier Development League for Jersey Express and in the National Premier Soccer League for New York Red Bulls U-23.

Seattle Sounders FC
On 15 January 2015, Fisher was selected in the second round (40th overall) in the 2015 MLS SuperDraft by Seattle Sounders FC and signed a professional contract with the club two months later.  On 21 March, he made his professional debut for USL affiliate club Seattle Sounders FC 2 in a 4–2 victory over defending USL champion Sacramento Republic FC.  He made his MLS debut the following week in a goalless draw away to FC Dallas.

D.C. United 
Fisher was traded to D.C. United ahead of the 2018 season. He made his debut for D.C. United against Orlando City on 3 March 2018. On 15 August 2018, he scored his first goal for the team in the 47th minute in the 4–1 victory against the Portland Timbers. Fisher sustained a knee injury during a game against Montreal Impact on 29 September 2018 and was out for the rest of the season and is not expected to return to the field until 3 November 2019. On 30 January 2019, D.C. United re-signed Fisher after having his option declined after the 2018 season. Fisher missed the entire 2019 season due to his injury.

He returned from his injury on 7 March 2020, entering the game against Inter Miami.

He was released by D.C. United on 30 November 2020.

LA Galaxy
On 15 February 2021, Fisher joined the LA Galaxy. Following the 2021 season, Fisher was released by LA Galaxy.

Minnesota United
On 2 February 2022, Fisher signed with Minnesota United and made his debut in Minnesota's season opener against the Philadelphia Union on 26 February. Following the 2022 season, his contract option was declined by Minnesota.

International career
On 11 August 2010, Fisher made his international debut for Jamaica in a 3–1 victory over Trinidad and Tobago.  He also played for the under-20 national team in the 2011 CONCACAF U-20 Championship.

Personal life
Fisher holds a U.S. green card which qualifies him as a domestic player for MLS roster purposes.

Career statistics

International goals
Scores and results list Jamaica's goal tally first.

Honours
Seattle Sounders FC
 MLS Cup: 2016

References

External links

New Mexico Lobos bio

1991 births
Living people
People from Saint Catherine Parish
Jamaican footballers
Jamaican expatriate footballers
Jamaica international footballers
New Mexico Lobos men's soccer players
Jersey Express S.C. players
New York Red Bulls U-23 players
Seattle Sounders FC players
Tacoma Defiance players
D.C. United players
LA Galaxy players
Minnesota United FC players
Association football defenders
Seattle Sounders FC draft picks
USL League Two players
Major League Soccer players
USL Championship players
Expatriate soccer players in the United States
Jamaican expatriate sportspeople in the United States
Tyler Apaches men's soccer players
2017 CONCACAF Gold Cup players
2021 CONCACAF Gold Cup players